Chief of the Defence Staff may refer to:

Chief of the Defence Staff (Canada)
Chief of the Defence Staff (France)
Chief of the Defence Staff (The Gambia)
Chief of the Defence Staff (Ghana)
Chief of the Defence Staff (India)
Chief of the Defence Staff (Italy)
Chief of the Defence Staff (Nigeria)
Chief of the Defence Staff (Sierra Leone)
Chief of the Defence Staff (Spain)
Chief of the Defence Staff (Sri Lanka)
Chief of Defence Staff (Sweden) 
Chief of the Defence Staff (United Kingdom)

See also
Defence Staff (disambiguation)
Chairman of the Joint Chiefs of Staff (disambiguation)
Chairman of the Joint Chiefs of Staff (United States)
Chief of the Air Staff (disambiguation)
Chief of Staff of the Air Force (disambiguation)
Chief of the Armed Forces (disambiguation)
Chief of Army Staff (disambiguation)
Chief of the Defence Force (disambiguation)
Chief of the General Staff
Chief of the Naval Staff (disambiguation)
Chief of Staff of the Navy (disambiguation)